Chris Meagher is an American political advisor serving as Assistant to the Secretary of Defense for Public Affairs under Secretary of Defense Lloyd Austin. He was appointed on September 9, 2022. He previously served as a White House Deputy Press Secretary in the Biden administration beginning March 1, 2021, succeeding TJ Ducklo. He also served as a senior public affairs official for Secretary of Transportation Pete Buttigieg.

Early life and education 
A native of Michigan, Meagher earned a Bachelor of Arts degree in journalism from Michigan State University. He then earned a Juris Doctor from the Santa Barbara & Ventura Colleges of Law.

Career 
Meagher began his career as a journalist, working for WILX-TV, The State News, The Modesto Bee, the Santa Barbara Daily Sound, and the Santa Barbara Independent. He then became the communications director for Congresswoman Lois Capps. Meagher was also a communications manager for General Motors and served as a senior communications advisor for the Colorado Democratic Party and Montana Democratic Party. In 2018, Meagher worked on Senator Jon Tester's re-election campaign as communications director. From March to June 2020, Meagher was briefly a communications advisor for Michigan Governor Gretchen Whitmer.

Meagher previously worked as the national press secretary for the Pete Buttigieg 2020 presidential campaign and joined the United States Department of Transportation as deputy director of public affairs in February 2021 after Buttigieg was confirmed as secretary.

References 

20th-century American journalists
American male journalists
Biden administration personnel
Living people
Michigan State University alumni
People from Michigan
Year of birth missing (living people)